In mathematics, the Wallis product for , published in 1656 by John Wallis, states that

Proof using integration 
Let

(This is a form of Wallis' integrals.) Integrate by parts:

Now, we make two variable substitutions for convenience to obtain:

Now, we calculate for even values  by repeatedly applying the recurrence relation result from the integration by parts.

Repeating the process for odd values ,

We make the following observation, based on the fact that 

Dividing by :

, where the equality comes from our recurrence relation.

By the squeeze theorem,

Proof using Laplace's method 
See the main page on Gaussian integral.

Proof using Euler's infinite product for the sine function  
While the proof above is typically featured in modern calculus textbooks, the Wallis product is, in retrospect, an easy corollary of the later Euler infinite product for the sine function.

Let :

Relation to Stirling's approximation

Stirling's approximation for the factorial function  asserts that

Consider now the finite approximations to the Wallis product, obtained by taking the first  terms in the product

where  can be written as

Derivative of the Riemann zeta function at zero
The Riemann zeta function and the Dirichlet eta function can be defined:

Applying an Euler transform to the latter series, the following is obtained:

See also

 John Wallis, English mathematician who is given partial credit for the development of infinitesimal calculus and pi.
 Wallis sieve

Notes

External links
 
 

Articles containing proofs
Pi algorithms
Infinite products